Epiactis is a genus of sea anemones in the family Actiniidae. There are about nineteen recognised species and the type species is Epiactis prolifera.

Taxonomy
A revision in 1989 determined that the genus Cnidopus was a synonym of Epiactis. At this time, two new species, E. lisbethae and E. fernaldi were described and E. ritteri was restored to the genus in which it was originally placed. Four species of Epiactis are known from the Pacific coast of North America, the external brooders E. prolifera and E. lisbethae which differ in sexuality and brooding periodicity, and the internal brooders E. ritteri and E. fernaldi, which differ in their cnidocyte armoury, sexuality and histology.

Species
 Epiactis adeliana Carlgren & Stephenson, 1929
 Epiactis arctica  (Verrill, 1868)
 Epiactis australiensis  Carlgren, 1950
 Epiactis brucei  Carlgren, 1939
 Epiactis fecunda  (Verrill, 1899)
 Epiactis fernaldi  Fautin & Chia, 1986
 Epiactis georgiana  Carlgren, 1927
 Epiactis handi Larson & Daly, 2015
 Epiactis incerta  Carlgren, 1921
 Epiactis irregularis  Carlgren, 1951
 Epiactis japonica  Verrill, 1869
 Epiactis lewisi  Carlgren, 1940
 Epiactis lisbethae  Fautin & Chia, 1986
 Epiactis marsupialis  Carlgren, 1901
 Epiactis neozealandica  Stephenson, 1918
 Epiactis nordmanni  Carlgren, 1921
 Epiactis novozealandica  Stephenson, 1918
 Epiactis prolifera  Verrill, 1869
 Epiactis ritteri  Torrey, 1902
 Epiactis thompsoni  (Coughtrey, 1875)
 Epiactis vincentina  Carlgren, 1939

Description
These sea anemones have a substantial base and a smooth column. The margin and fosse are distinct and the sphincter well developed. The tentacles that surround the oral disc are short and unbranched and not narrower at the base. The longitudinal muscles of the tentacles and the radial muscles of the oral disc are usually ectodermal. The mesenteries in the gastroventicular cavity are arranged hexagonally and are greater in number at the base than at the margin. Twelve or more pairs of mesenteries are perfect and the gonads develop on these. The retractors are often very strong and are diffuse or restricted. The cnidocytes include spirocysts, basitriches and microbasic p-mastigophors. Juveniles develop in brood pouches or attached to the column.

References

Actiniidae
Cnidarian genera
Taxa named by Addison Emery Verrill